{{DISPLAYTITLE:C16H13N3O4}}
The molecular formula C16H13N3O4 (molar mass: 311.29 g/mol, exact mass: 311.0906 u) may refer to:

 Icilin
 Nitromethaqualone

Molecular formulas